Sicilian pizza is pizza prepared in a manner that originated in Sicily, Italy. Sicilian pizza is also known as sfincione or focaccia with toppings.
This type of pizza became a popular dish in western Sicily by the mid-19th century and was the type of pizza usually consumed in Sicily until the 1860s. It eventually reached North America in a slightly altered form, with thicker crust and a rectangular shape.

Traditional Sicilian pizza is often thick crusted and rectangular, but can also be round and similar to the Neapolitan pizza. It is often topped with onions, anchovies, tomatoes, herbs and strong cheese such as caciocavallo and toma. Other versions do not include cheese.

The Sicilian methods of making pizza are linked to local culture and country traditions, so there are differences in preparing pizza among the Sicilian regions of Palermo, Catania, Siracusa and Messina.

Variations
The sfincione (or sfinciuni in Sicilian language) is a very common variety of pizza that originated in the province of Palermo. Unlike  Neapolitan pizza, it is typically rectangular, with more dough, sauce and cheese. An authentic recipe often calls for herbs, onion, tomato sauce, strong cheese and anchovies. The sauce is sometimes placed on top of the toppings to prevent it from soaking into the thick dough.

Siracusa

In the province of Siracusa, especially in Solarino and Sortino, the pizzòlu is a kind of round stuffed pizza.

Catania
In the province of Catania the traditional scacciata is made in two different ways: a first layer made of dough covered, within the city, by a local cheese (tuma) and anchovies or, in the region around Catania, by potatoes, sausages, broccoli, and tomato sauce. In both cases a second layer of dough brushed with eggs covers everything. Also in the region of Catania, in Zafferana Etnea and in Viagrande a typical pizza siciliana is a fried calzone stuffed with cheese and anchovies.

Messina
In the province of Messina, the traditional piduni is a kind of calzone stuffed with endive, toma cheese, tomato and anchovies. There is also the focaccia alla messinese, prepared with tomato sauce, toma cheese, vegetables and anchovies.

United States
In the United States, "Sicilian pizza" is used to describe a typically square variety of cheese pizza with dough over an inch thick, a crunchy base, and an airy interior. It is derived from the sfinciuni and was introduced in the United States by the first Italian (Sicilian) immigrants. Sicilian-style pizza is popular in Italian-American enclaves throughout the northeastern United States, including Massachusetts, Rhode Island,  Connecticut, New York, New Jersey, Pennsylvania, and also Michigan (which would influence Detroit-style pizza). In some parts of coastal Massachusetts and New Hampshire, it is also known as "beach pizza" because of its prevalence along the Route 1A corridor. A similar dish, perhaps often overlapping or confused with sfincione, is tomato pie.

Gallery

See also

 Pizza al taglio
 Neapolitan pizza
 Detroit-style pizza
 Italian tomato pie
 List of Sicilian dishes
 List of pizza varieties by country

References

External links
 

Cuisine of Sicily
Palermitan cuisine
Pizza styles
Sicilian-American cuisine
Street food
Cuisine of New York City
Street food in Italy

scn:Pizza siciliana